Edward F. Holland (1931 or 1932 – May 19, 2015) was an American politician who served as a Democratic member of the Rhode Island Senate who represented the 6th Senate district, encompassing South Kingstown and New Shoreham from 1995 to 1997.

Political career 
Holland was first elected to the State Senate in 1994, beating Republican nominee R. Harold Thomas following the retirement of incumbent Senator Walter J. Gray. Holland won the election with 3,345 votes, or 52.6% of the vote.

Holland won unopposed in the 1996 Democratic Primary, winning 629 votes, but was defeated in the November 5, 1996 General Election by Republican Susan Sosnowksi, with only 3,337 votes (45%) to her 4,066 votes (55%).

Personal life 
Holland was a cartographer for the Defense Mapping Agency, now part of the National Geospatial Intelligence Agency for 37 years.
Holland was married to Eleanor Q. Webster and together they had 3 children. Holland also raised 3 step-children.

Holland died in his sleep on May 19, 2015 at the Westview Health Care Center in West Warwick at the age of 84.

References

Democratic Party Rhode Island state senators
20th-century American politicians
1930s births
2015 deaths
Year of birth uncertain
People from South Kingstown, Rhode Island